William Ruthven, 1st Earl of Gowrie, 4th Lord of Ruthven (c. 1541May 1584) was a Scottish peer known for devising the Raid of Ruthven.

Life and career
William Ruthven was born in 1541 in Ruthven Castle, in Perthshire, Scotland, the son of Patrick Ruthven, 3rd Lord Ruthven and Janet Douglas.  On 23 August 1581, he was named Earl of Gowrie by James VI of Scotland.

He and his father had both been involved in the murder of David Rizzio in 1566; and both took an active part on the side of the Kirk in the constant intrigues and factions among the Scottish nobility of the period. William had been the custodian of Mary, Queen of Scots, during her imprisonment in Loch Leven Castle, where, according to the queen, he had pestered her with amorous attentions.

Ruthven wrote a friendly letter to his "great aunt" Margaret Douglas, Countess of Lennox in June 1571 during the Marian Civil War. He asked about the health of her son Charles Stuart, 1st Earl of Lennox and hoped for peaceful times in which she could visit Scotland. He said the young James VI was growing tall.

In 1582 Ruthven devised and undertook the Raid of Ruthven, a plot to seize the fifteen-year-old King James during a visit to his house in Perth. Ruthven remained at the head of the government for several months during the detention. Ruthven continued to plot against the king, and was the last-known custodian of the silver casket that contained the Casket Letters; letters said to have been written by Mary, Queen of Scots, implicating her in the murder of her husband, Henry Stuart, Lord Darnley.

Ruthven was arrested at his house in Dundee by Colonel William Stewart. Stewart surrounded the house with 100 soldiers from 3 o'clock in the morning to 3' o'clock in the afternoon before Ruthven surrendered, when the town of Dundee was ordered received an order from James VI to take arms against him. Ruthven was shipped to Leith and brought to Holyrood Palace. He was taken to Kinneil House and then to Stirling Castle. His trial was held in Mar's Wark or "Lady Mar's house" at Stirling. The judges included John Graham, Lord HallyardsThe charges, recorded by Roger Aston, included "witchcraft in conferring with sorcerers".

He was beheaded at Stirling on 3 May 1584 because of his leading involvement in the Raid of Ruthven and all of his honors were forfeited.

Following his execution, his lands were divided among the king's favourites, but the honours were restored to his son James in 1586.

His widow, Dorothea Stewart came to the opening of Parliament on 22 August 1584 and kneeled on the Royal Mile crying to the king for grace for her children. James Stewart, Earl of Arran pushed her away, and she fainted and was left on the street.

A letter produced in the posthumous trial of Robert Logan of Restalrig in 1609 referred to William Ruthven as Greysteil, a character in a popular poem of his time noted for his strength and sinister powers, enthralled to a powerful woman.

Marriage and children
William Ruthven was married to Dorothea Stewart, the oldest daughter of Henry Stewart, 1st Lord Methven and Janet Stewart, daughter of John Stewart, 2nd Earl of Atholl.

Scots Peerage lists 14 children of William and Dorothea, ten daughters and four sons:
 James Ruthven, 2nd Earl of Gowrie (died 1588)
 John Ruthven, 3rd Earl of Gowrie (c. 15775 August 1600)
 Alexander Ruthven (12 January 15805 August 1600)
 William Ruthven, died in France prior to 1622
 Patrick Ruthven, imprisoned for 19 years in the Tower of London. Father of Mary Ruthven, who married the painter Anthony van Dyck.
 Mary Ruthven, married to John Stewart, 5th Earl of Atholl, and then after his death married John Stewart, 1st Earl of Atholl (1566–1603)
 Margaret Ruthven, married to John Graham, 4th Earl of Montrose, mother of James Graham, 1st Marquess of Montrose
 Sophia Ruthven (died May 1592), first wife of Ludovic Stewart, 2nd Duke of Lennox
 Jean Ruthven, mother of James Ogilvy, 1st Earl of Airlie
 Elizabeth "Isabel" Ruthven, who married Robert Gordon of Lochinvar, and was mother of John Gordon, 1st Viscount of Kenmure
 Beatrix Ruthven, lady in waiting to Anne of Denmark, wife of John Home of Cowdenknowes
 Lilias, about whom little is known, the English ambassador wrote she was "dead also with sorrow" after her father's execution in May 1584.
 Dorothea, who married John Wemyss of Pittencrieff
 Barbara Ruthven, lady in waiting to Anne of Denmark

Another source, Paterson's History of the Counties of Ayr and Wigton lists another daughter named Elizabeth, explicitly called "Elizabeth (Not Isabel)":

 Elizabeth Ruthven (died 1617), second wife of Sir Hugh Campbell of Loudon (died 1622).

There were plans in 1591 for Dorothea Stewart, Countess of Gowrie to marry William Keith of Delny but James VI forbade it.

John and Alexander Ruthven were killed on 5 August 1600 as the main characters in The Gowrie Conspiracy, a failed attempt to kidnap or murder James VI.

References

Sources

External links

1540s births
1584 deaths
16th-century Scottish people
William
Executed Scottish people
People executed for treason against Scotland
16th-century executions by Scotland
Treasurers of Scotland
People executed by the Kingdom of Scotland by decapitation
Scottish politicians convicted of crimes
Ruthven family